Jacques Bogopolsky (also Jacques Boolsky or Jacques Bolsey; born Yakov Bogopolsky; December 31, 1895, Kiev, Kiev Governorate, Russian Empire – January 20, 1962, Long Island) was an engineer and camera designer.

He was born into a Jewish family. He was a prolific inventor of revolutionary movie cameras. The brand name Bolex comes from his name. He was also instrumental in the initial design of the Alpa-Reflex Camera 35mm single-lens reflex camera that later was developed into the Alpa cameras.

External links 
Documentary on Jacques Bogopolsky
Alpa Reflex Camera

1895 births
1962 deaths
Engineers from Kyiv
People from Kiev Governorate
20th-century Ukrainian engineers